For the 1991 Eurovision Song Contest in Rome, the song "Could It Be That I'm in Love", written and composed by Liam Reilly and performed by Kim Jackson, was chosen to represent Ireland, after it won the national final selection. Composer Liam Reilly had represented Ireland in the 1990 Eurovision Song Contest in Zagreb, coming in second place with his own composition; Kim Jackson had also provided backing vocals for that entry.

Before Eurovision

National final 
Held on 30 March 1991 at the RTÉ television centre in Dublin, the national final selection was hosted by Pat Kenny. Originally, eight songs were set to compete, but one was withdrawn the week before the contest, bringing the number of songs to seven. The winner was selected by ten regional juries. After the regional juries had voted, songs 5 and 7 were tied. A special tiebreak jury was called to determine the winner, choosing "Could It Be That I'm in Love".

==At Eurovision " was performed eleventh in the running order on the night of the contest, following Turkey and preceding Portugal. At the close of the voting sequence, Ireland had 47 points, tying them with the United Kingdom for tenth place.

RTÉ 1 broadcast the contest with Pat Kenny providing the television commentary. Kenny had previously handled the radio coverage between 1980 and 1982 and later hosted the 1988 Contest. RTÉ Radio 1 also broadcast the contest with commentary provided by Larry Gogan. Eileen Dunne served as spokesperson for the Irish jury.

Voting

References

1991
Countries in the Eurovision Song Contest 1991
Eurovision
Eurovision